Statistics of American Soccer League II in season 1943–44.

Metropolitan Division

New England Division

The league was dormant in its final season.

References

American Soccer League (1933–1983) seasons
Amer